George Aimer (27 October 1897 – 5 June 1935) was a Scottish footballer who played in the English Football League for Fulham for two years, and spent roughly the same period with each of Dundee Hibernian, Dundee and Third Lanark in his homeland.

In 1927 he moved to the United States and signed with Providence of the American Soccer League. In the spring of 1931, he played for Fall River and finished his career with the New York Giants in the fall of 1931.

Aimer was killed in an accident during the demolition of a wall at Polepark Works, Dundee, on 5 June 1935, aged 37. Having seen that the tottering wall would bring down with it a heavy roof beam, and fearing that one of his workmates was in danger, he dashed through a doorway, being struck in the head.

References

External links
 

American Soccer League (1921–1933) players
Scottish footballers
Dundee F.C. players
Dundee United F.C. players
Fall River F.C. players
Fulham F.C. players
New York Giants (soccer, 1930–1932) players
Providence Clamdiggers players
English Football League players
Scottish Football League players
Scottish expatriate footballers
Expatriate soccer players in the United States
1897 births
1935 deaths
Third Lanark A.C. players
Footballers from Dundee
Association football fullbacks
Scottish expatriate sportspeople in the United States
Industrial accident deaths